Atakunmosa West is a Local Government Area in Osun State, Nigeria. Its headquarters are in the town of Osu (or Oshu) in the north of the area at.

It has an area of  577 km and a population of 68,643 at the 2006 census.

The postal code of the area is 233.

References

Local Government Areas in Osun State